Chris Sanders (born 1962) is an American film director, animator and voice actor.

Chris Sanders may also refer to:

Chris Sanders (quarterback) (born 1977), quarterback for the Dallas Desperados
Chris Sanders (running back) (born 1973), running back for Washington Redskins
Chris Sanders (wide receiver) (born 1972), wide receiver for the Houston Oilers/Tennessee Titans
Chris Sanders (cricketer) (born 1998), English cricketer
C. J. Sanders (born 1996), American football wide receiver for the Notre Dame Fighting Irish